The Norfolk Formation is a geologic formation in Virginia. It preserves fossils dating back to the Neogene period.

See also

 List of fossiliferous stratigraphic units in Virginia
 Paleontology in Virginia

References
 

Geologic formations of Virginia